Matúš Kuník (born 14 May 1997) is a Slovak footballer who last played for FC Petržalka as a defender.

Club career

FC Nitra
Kuník made his Fortuna Liga debut for Nitra against Žilina on 22 July 2017. Kuník played the entire match as Nitra achieved a surprising 1-0 victory.

References

External links
 FC Nitra official club profile
 
 Futbalnet profile

1997 births
Living people
Sportspeople from Piešťany
Slovak footballers
Slovakia youth international footballers
Association football defenders
FC Nitra players
ŠKF Sereď players
FC Petržalka players
Slovak Super Liga players